Frederick L. Warder (September 17, 1912 – July 23, 1980) was an American politician from New York.

Life
He was born on September 17, 1912, in Geneva, Ontario County, New York. He married Justine Crandall (1914–2002), and they had three children.

Warder entered politics as a Republican, and was an alderman, and then Mayor, of Geneva.

He was a member of the New York State Assembly from 1963 to 1972, sitting in the 174th, 175th, 176th, 177th, 178th and 179th New York State Legislatures.

He was a member of the New York State Senate from 1973 until his death in 1980, sitting in the 180th, 181st, 182nd and 183rd New York State Legislatures.

He died on July 23, 1980, in Geneva General Hospital in Geneva, New York, of cancer; and was buried at the Glenwood Cemetery there.

References

External links
 

1912 births
1980 deaths
Politicians from Geneva, New York
Republican Party New York (state) state senators
Republican Party members of the New York State Assembly
Mayors of places in New York (state)
Deaths from cancer in New York (state)
20th-century American politicians